The following is a list of teams and cyclists that took part in the 2021 Vuelta a España.

Teams 
Twenty-three teams participated in the 2021 Vuelta a España. All nineteen UCI WorldTeams were obliged to participate. Four UCI ProTeams also participated:  was automatically invited as the best-performing ProTeam in 2020, as well as three wildcard teams selected by the Amaury Sport Organization. Usually, only twenty-two teams would participate in the race, but the Union Cycliste Internationale allowed grand tour organizers to invite one extra wildcard team in 2021 to account for hardship created by the COVID-19 pandemic.

UCI WorldTeams

 
 
 
 
 
 
 
 
 
 
 
 
 
 
 
 
 
 
 

UCI ProTeams

Cyclists

By starting number

By team

By nationality

References 

2021 Vuelta a España
2021